555 is a 1988 American horror film directed and produced by Wally Koz and written by Roy Koz.

Plot 

While making out on the beach, a couple is attacked by a blade-wielding man dressed like a hippie. After beheading the man with a machete, the hippie slashes the woman to death with a dagger, then sexually assaults her corpse. Charged with solving "the Lake Front Butcher" murders (as the media have dubbed them) are Sergeant Connor and Detective Haller, whose main suspect is the man who found the bodies, a retired army colonel named Peter Wayne. Routinely intruding upon the investigation is stubborn local reporter Susan Rather, the occasional lover of Assistant District Attorney Ralph Kennedy.

Over the next two nights two more couples are butchered, one in their van, and the other in an abandoned factory. The modus operandi (male killed with a machete, the female killed with a knife and raped post-mortem) is the same, and the theory that Wayne is the killer is strengthened when he goes into hiding. Shortly after another couple is killed (this time in their bedroom) on the fourth night, Connor finds Wayne, who he had discovered had lived in at least two of the four cities where similar crimes (five couples killed over the course of five nights, each spree five years apart) have occurred. However, due to a lack of solid evidence connecting him to any of the murders, Wayne (who claims to have only hid because he believed Connor was personally out to get him) is let go.

After Wayne's release, Connor and Haller are approached by Susan, who claims that Ralph is the Lake Front Butcher. Susan explains that she had earlier snuck into the station to look through the case files, and found out that the ex-boyfriend of the very first victim (murdered twenty years ago in Massachusetts alongside her lover) was named Joseph Ralph Dwyer, which is Ralph's birth name. Searching for Ralph, the trio track him down to the abandoned factory, where he is killed in a shootout, though only after claiming the lives of another young couple, completing his pattern for the fifth time.

Cast 

 Mara Lynn Bastian as Susan Rather
 Charles Fuller as Colonel Peter Wayne
 Greg Kerouac as Sergeant Connor
 Greg Neilson as Ralph Kennedy/Joseph Ralph Dwyer
 B.K. Smith as Detective Johnny Haller
 Bob Grabill as The Killer and Police Officer
 Wally Koz (voice) as Captain Luca
 Ricardo Alvarez as First Male Victim 
 Temple Mead as First Female Victim
 Skip Grisham as Second Male Victim
 Anita Reformado as Second Female Victim
 Scott Hermes as Tommy (Third Male Victim)
 Anne Walker as Tommy's girlfriend (Third Female Victim) 
 Richard Orchard as Angie's Boyfriend (Fourth Male Victim)
 Christine Cabana as Angie (Fourth Female Victim) 
 Roy Koz as Fifth Male Victim  
 Doreen Semese as Fifth Female Victim
 Jeff Dieter as Police Officer
 Frankie 'Hollywood" Rodriquez as Vito 
 David Trelford as Corner’s Attendant
 Pat Mongoven (voice) as Dispatcher

Reception 

Blood Capsules awarded 555 three stars, and wrote that the script was decent, the acting enthusiastic, and the effects occasionally impressive. Trash Film Guru found the film enjoyable, despite the low productions values, abysmal acting, and occasional dullness. Critical Condition said that while 555 was by no means good, it did have decent acting, and gore effects. A score of one and half ("Bad") was given by The Bloody Pit of Horror, which said the film was highly inept on a technical level, and suffered from obnoxious characters, bad dialogue and acting, a pedestrian and ridiculous mystery, a silly plot, and a limp finale. The Worldwide Celluloid Massacre found the acting weak and the plot formulaic, and stated the only memorable aspect of the film was two or three over-the-top splatter scenes.

The Video Graveyard categorized the film as garbage with lame gore and amateurish acting, though the website admitted that the "compellingly awful indie effort" is worth watching once by bad movie enthusiasts. Video Junkie Strikes Back from the Grave quipped "The only thing going for 555 is the effects work, which is suitably gory". Soiled Sinema summed up 555 as a "complete piece of zombie shit" that offered only a minimal amount of entertainment.

Home media 
It was originally released on VHS in 1988 by Slaughterhouse Entertainment (Wally Koz's distribution company) However, VHS prints of the film have become collector's items due to their limited quantities. VHS copies of the film have been spotted on eBay with extremely high prices (such as one copy selling for $350.00).

In 2011, Massacre Video released the film for the first time on DVD. It includes special features such as interviews with actor Scott Hermes, special effects artist Jeffrey Lyle Segal, and a slideshow of behind the scenes photos.

References

External links 

 

1980s slasher films
American slasher films
American direct-to-video films
American splatter films
Camcorder films
1988 horror films
Films set in 1988
American serial killer films
American police detective films
Films about journalists
Necrophilia in film
American independent films
1988 direct-to-video films
Direct-to-video horror films
Films set in Chicago
Films shot in Chicago
1980s police procedural films
1980s serial killer films
1988 directorial debut films
1988 independent films
1988 films
1980s English-language films
American exploitation films
1980s American films